Southampton Football Club, an English association football club based in Southampton, Hampshire, was founded in 1885 as St. Mary's Y.M.A. For almost six years the club took no part in any official competitions at national level, playing only friendlies and local tournaments, including the Hampshire Senior Cup. St Mary's first entered the FA Cup in the 1891–92 season, and in 1894 under the name Southampton St Mary's joined the newly founded Southern Football League.

The club changed its name to simply Southampton at the start of the 1896–97 season, and quickly established themselves as the primary force in football in the South of England, winning the Southern League three times in a row. The club also reached the semi-finals of the FA Cup in 1898, losing the replay 2–0 to Nottingham Forest after a 1–1 draw. The Saints continued to dominate the league into the 20th century, claiming the championship again in 1901, 1903 and 1904, before joining the Football League Third Division as a founding member in 1920, following the absorption of the Southern League. Southampton were almost instantly promoted to the Second Division, completing the feat as champions in the 1921–22 season.

Southampton found life in the second flight of English football difficult, as they remained a mid-bottom table side throughout the seasons played before and immediately after the Second World War, before they were ultimately relegated back to the Third Division in 1953. Promoted as champions again in 1960, Southampton performed well in the following ten years, reaching the quarter-final stage in the newly created League Cup in 1961 and earning promotion to Division One in 1966 as division runners-up. The club received its first taste of continental football in the 1969–70 season when they competed in the Inter-Cities Fairs Cup, although were knocked out in the first round. Despite suffering relegation back to Division Two in 1974, Southampton achieved a surprise victory in the 1976 FA Cup Final against Manchester United to win the trophy for the first and only time in the club's history. This success was topped off two seasons later when the club regained its First Division place.

The 1983–84 season was Southampton's most successful in terms of league position, when the club finished second in the top flight to Liverpool, missing out on the championship by just three points. In the 1990s, the club largely struggled to get out of the bottom third of the table, although they reached the advanced stages of the FA Cup and League Cup on a number of occasions and also played in the Full Members Cup final in 1992. The club became founder members of the Premier League in 1992 but continued their disappointing performances, despite reaching the 2003 FA Cup Final against Arsenal and losing to a single goal. Southampton were relegated to the Championship in the 2004–05 season, and were quickly relegated again following off-the-pitch problems in 2009. In their first season in League One, Southampton won the League Trophy with an emphatic 4–1 win against Carlisle United. The following season, Southampton were promoted to the Championship as runners-up in League One.

As of the end of the 2021–22 season, the club have spent 45 seasons in the top division of English football, 39 in the second, and 11 in the third.

The table details their achievements in all national and international first team competitions, and records their manager, the top goalscorer, the player with the most league appearances and the average home league attendance, for each completed season since their first appearance in the FA Cup in 1891–92.

Competitions
The club has participated in the following leagues:
 The Southern League (from 1894–95 to 1919–20)
 The Football League (from 1920–21 to 1991–92 and from 2005–06 to 2011–12)
 The Premier League (from 1992–93 to 2004–05 and since 2012–13)

The club has participated in the following other first-team tournaments:
FA Cup (since 1891–92)
Southern Professional Floodlit Cup (from 1957–58 to 1959–60)
EFL Cup (since 1960–61)
Inter-Cities Fairs Cup (in 1969–70)
UEFA Cup / Europa League (in 1971–72, 1981–82, 1982–83, 1984–85, 2003–04, 2015–16, 2016–17)
Texaco Cup (in 1974–75)
Community Shield (in 1976)
 Anglo-Italian League Cup (in 1976)
European Cup Winners' Cup (in 1976–77)
Super Cup (in 1985–86)
Full Members Cup (from 1986–87 to 1991–92)
Football League Trophy (from 2009–10 to 2010–11)

Key

Pld – Matches played
W – Matches won
D – Matches drawn
L – Matches lost
GF – Goals for
GA – Goals against
Pts – Points
Pos – Final position

2Q – Second qualifying round
3Q – Third qualifying round
PO – Play-off round
GS – Group stage
R1 – First round
R2 – Second round, etc.
QF – Quarter-finals
SF – Semi-finals

Div 1 – Football League First Division
Div 2 – Football League Second Division
Div 3 – Football League Third Division
Div 3(S) – Football League Third Division South
Prem – Premier League
Champ – EFL Championship
Lge 1 – EFL League One
SL Div 1 – Southern League Division One

Top scorer shown in bold when player was also top scorer for the division. Appearance number shown in bold when player played in every league match of the season.
League results shown in italics for abandoned competition.

Seasons

Overall (since 1920–22)
Seasons spent at Level 1 of the football league system: 45
Seasons spent at Level 2 of the football league system: 39
Seasons spent at Level 3 of the football league system: 11
Seasons spent at Level 4 of the football league system: 0

Notes

References

Seasons
 
English football club seasons
Southampton-related lists